Sir Alfred Henry Lionel Leach , KC (3 February 1883 – 26 January 1960) was a British judge who served as a judge of the Rangoon High Court from 1933 to 1937, Chief Justice of the Madras High Court from 1937 to 1947 and a member of the Judicial Committee of the Privy Council from 1949 to 1960.

Early life and education 

Lionel Leach was born in Rochdale, the son of barrister Robert Alfred Leach on 3 February 1883. Lionel Leach was called to the bar in 1907.

Career 

In 1933, Leach was appointed puisne judge of the Rangoon High Court. He served until 1937 when he was transferred to Madras as Chief Justice of the Madras High Court. He was knighted in the 1938 New Year Honours. The most important trial of his tenure was the Lakshmikanthan Murder Case and Leach presided over the sensational trial in 1944 in which M. K. Thyagaraja Bhagavathar and N. S. Krishnan were found guilty.

Leach served until 1 February 1947 and was succeeded by William Gentle. In 1949, Leach took silk, was sworn of the Privy Council, and headed the Singapore Riots Inquiry Commission of 1951 that made recommendations after the Maria Hertogh riots. He was appointed by Governor Sir Franklin Gimson.

Death 

Lionel Leach died in his chambers at Gray's Inn Square on 26 January 1960 at the age of 76.

References

1883 births
1960 deaths
People from Rochdale
Members of Gray's Inn
Companions of the Order of the Indian Empire
Chief Justices of the Madras High Court
Knights Bachelor
British India judges
Members of the Privy Council of the United Kingdom
British Burma judges
English King's Counsel
British people in colonial India
British people in British Burma